The Banking Regulation Act, 1949 is a legislation in India that regulates all banking firms in India. Passed as the Banking Companies Act 1949, it came into force from 16 March 1949 and changed to Banking Regulation Act 1949 from 1 March 1966. It is applicable in Jammu and Kashmir from 1956.  Initially, the law was applicable only to banking companies. But, in 1965 it was amended to make it applicable to cooperative banks and to introduce other changes. In 2020 it was amended to bring the cooperative banks under the supervision of the Reserve Bank of India.

Overview
The Act provides a framework under which commercial banking in India is supervised and regulated. The Act supplements the Companies Act, 1956. Primary Agricultural Credit Society and cooperative land mortgage banks are excluded from the Act.

The Act gives the Reserve Bank of India (RBI) the power to license banks, have regulation over shareholding and voting rights of shareholders; supervise the appointment of the boards and management; regulate the operations of banks; lay down instructions for audits; control moratorium, mergers and liquidation; issue directives in the interests of public good and on banking policy, and impose penalties.

In 1965, the Act was amended to include cooperative banks under its purview by adding the Section 56. Cooperative banks, which operate only in one state, are formed and run by the state government. But, RBI controls the licensing and regulates the business operations. The Banking Act was a supplement to the previous acts related to banking.

Amendments

In 2020, Finance Minister Nirmala Sitaraman introduced a bill to amend the Act. The bill sought to bring all cooperative banks under the Reserve Bank of India. It brought 1,482 urban and 58 multi-state cooperative banks under the supervision of the RBI. The bill granted the RBI ability to reconstruct or merge banks without moratoriums. The bill was passed by the parliament.

See also

 Banking in India
 Public Debt Act, 1944
 Reserve Bank of India Act, 1934

References

Banking in India
Acts of the Parliament of India 1949
Bank regulation
Financial regulation in India
Financial history of India